Jamieson Leeson (born 18 March 2003) is an Australian boccia player. She represented Australia at the 2020 Tokyo Paralympics.

Early life 
She was born on 18 March 2003 with spinal muscular atrophy. She uses a wheelchair and her mother, Amanda, is her primary carer. The rugby league's Men of League Foundation provided her family with a customised van with specialist wheelchair lift to help her daily transport. In 2021, she lives in Dunedoo, New South Wales and attends Dunedoo Central School.

Boccia 
She began playing in 2018 where she was scouted in a school’s knock out competition in Orange, New South Wales and trains in Sydney under Australia's Boccia Head Coach Ken Halliday. In March 2019, Jamieson competed in her first ever boccia competition, winning gold in pairs. She has won silver medals in the singles and pairs at the 2019 Boccia Australia National Titles.

In May 2019, she won a bronze medal in the pairs at the Hong Kong World Open. In July 2019, she competed in both the pairs and individual events at the Seoul Asia-Oceania Regional Championships, winning her first ever international individual game against a Paralympic gold medalist.

In 2021, she received a Tier 3 Scholarship within the Sport Australia Hall of Fame Scholarship & Mentoring Program.

At the 2020 Tokyo Paralympics, she teamed with Daniel Michel and Spencer Cotie in the Mixed Pairs BC3, where they won 2 and lost 2 matches but failed to qualify for the quarter-finals.

Leeson won the silver medal in the Women's BC3 and the gold medal in the Mixed Pairs BC3 at the 2022 World Championships in Rio de Janeiro. She lost 2-6 to Anna Costa in the final of the Women's BC3.

At just 16, Jamieson has been the youngest person ever to represent  Australia in boccia.

References

External links 
 

2003 births
Living people
Boccia players at the 2020 Summer Paralympics
Paralympic boccia players of Australia
People with spinal muscular atrophy